Idioglossa triacma is a species of moth of the family Batrachedridae. It is known from the Khasi Hills of India.

The wingspan is about 10 mm. The forewings are orange-yellow with a purplish-fuscous-golden triangular blotch at one-third, almost reaching the costa.

Biology
The host plant of this species is Commelina benghalensis (Commelinaceae).

Related pages
List of moths of India

References

Moths described in 1913
Batrachedridae